, also known as , was a Japanese calligrapher and poet of the early Heian period.

Life
Takamura was a descendant of Ono no Imoko who served as Kenzuishi, and his father was Ono no Minemori. In 834 he was appointed to Kintōshi, but in 838 after a quarrel with the envoy, Fujiwara no Tsunetsugu, he gave up his professional duties pretending to be ill, and attracted the ire of retired Emperor Saga, who sent him to Oki Province. Within two years he regained the graces of the court and returned to the capital where he was promoted to Sangi.

Takamura is the subject of a number of odd stories and legends. One of the most singular of these legends is the claim that every night he would climb down a well to hell and help  in his . In Sataku, Kyoto, there is a grave said to belong to Takamura.

Takamura in later literature

Takamura features in several later setsuwa works such as the Ujishūi Monogatari and the Takamura Monogatari.

Ujishūi Monogatari 
In Ujishūi Monogatari there is the following story about Takamura that illustrates his wit. One day in the palace of Saga Tennō, someone erected a scroll with the writing "無悪善" (NO EVIL GOODNESS). No one in the palace was able to decipher its meaning. The emperor was incensed at his audacity and proclaimed that because only Takamura was able to read the scroll, he must have been the one who put it up in the first place. However, Takamura pleaded his innocence, saying that he was simply deciphering the meaning of the scroll. The emperor said, "Oh, so you can decipher any writing, can you?" and asked Takamura to read a row of twelve characters for : "子子子子子子子子子子子子". Takamura immediately responded: , using the variant readings ne, ko, shi, ji for the character (子). The emperor was amused by Takamura's wit and withdrew the accusation.

Takamura Monogatari 
Takamura is the main character in the tale Takamura Monogatari, where he has a romantic affair with his half-sister. The work's date is heavily disputed, and few scholars take it to be historically reliable.

Descendants 
While people such as Ono no Michikaze are Takamura's direct descendants, he also had several spiritual descendants among the Samurai.

Representative poems 
One of his poems is included as No. 11 in Fujiwara no Teika's Ogura Hyakunin Isshu:

Takamura contributed six poems to the Kokin Wakashū: #335, 407, 829, 845, 936, and 961.

Works related to Takamura

See also 

Japanese literature

References

Bibliography 
Katagiri Yōichi 2009 (2nd ed.; 1st ed. 2005). Kokin Wakashū. Tokyo: Kinuma Shoin.
McMillan, Peter 2010 (1st ed. 2008). One Hundred Poets, One Poem Each. New York: Columbia University Press.
Suzuki Hideo, Yamaguchi Shin'ichi, Yoda Yasushi 2009 (1st ed. 1997). Genshoku: Ogura Hyakunin Isshu. Tokyo: Bun'eidō.

802 births
853 deaths
9th-century Japanese calligraphers
9th-century Japanese poets
Deified Japanese people
Hyakunin Isshu poets